Viva Piñata is a 2006 life simulation game developed by Rare and published by Microsoft Game Studios for the Xbox 360. The game revolves around the player tending to a neglected garden in Piñata Island, in which different variations of piñatas based on animals must be bred whilst fending off disruptive interlopers. The project was headed by Gregg Mayles and the team behind the Banjo-Kazooie series, based on an idea from Rare co-founder Tim Stamper. Microsoft wanted the game to become a key franchise for the platform, and developed a tie-in television show to accompany the series. Viva Piñata was released in November 2006.

The game received positive reviews from critics, who praised the graphics, color palette, and numerous types of piñatas. They disliked the disruption caused by frequent autosaving. A Windows version, handled by Climax Group, was released in November 2007. The game started the Viva Piñata series, with a direct sequel and a portable version both released in 2008. Viva Piñata is included in Rare's 2015 Rare Replay, a compilation of 30 games for the Xbox One.

Gameplay

Viva Piñata is a first-person life simulation game in which the player restores and tends to a neglected garden on Piñata Island. The player uses gardening tools, such as shovels and watering cans, to plough their garden, sow seeds, create ponds, and sculpt the garden to their liking. When certain requirements are fulfilled, the garden will attract a black-and-white outline of a given piñata species. After fulfilling additional requirements, the piñata will become a resident, changing into a full-color version.

Once two piñatas of the same species are residents and their mating requirements are met, they can perform a "romance" dance. If the player successfully completes a maze minigame, the romance results in a baby piñata egg, which is delivered by a stork. The piñatas are not gendered, and hence any two piñatas of the same species can mate. Once a  piñata species has successfully romanced, the player can use a candy shortcut to bypass their original romance requirements. The player can hatch the egg or send it to another player over Xbox Live. The game's antagonists include the "Ruffians" led by Professor Pester and "sour piñatas" who occasionally enter the player's garden with the sole intent of wreaking havoc: eating seeds, dropping poisonous piñata candies, and destroying objects. The player may tame sour piñatas by constructing fences around them. Weeds may occasionally sprout in the player's garden and will quickly spread to destroy vegetable rows if the player does not kill them in time.

The game features sixty types of piñatas. Certain animals are "piñatavores", and must eat other piñatas to become residents or reproduce. A food chain (referred to as the doughnut of life) exists, with a number of piñata species having one or two others that are considered prey. When such piñatas are visiting the garden, they devour garden residents to satisfy their residency requirements. Once piñatas are residents, they will not eat each other unless instructed to do so by the player, although fights can break out between residents who do not share the predator–prey relationship. Piñatas die when they are broken open, either from another piñata's predaciousness, the hit of the player's or Professor Pester's shovel, or following an extended illness. Dead piñatas forfeit their equipped accessories. Players were also able to trade their piñatas with other players over the internet via Xbox Live.

Development
Rare co-founder Tim Stamper conceptualized a gardening game for the handheld Pocket PC platform in 2002. A three-person team began work on a simple prototype while the company was still affiliated with Nintendo, prior to its Microsoft acquisition. Development transferred to the original Xbox and, ultimately, to the Xbox 360 for its enhanced graphical capabilities. The development team wanted its animals to have a unified style, which was how the concept artist arrived at the piñata concept. The idea was exciting for the team, as piñatas were not commonplace in the United Kingdom. The connection between piñatas and candy-filled insides led to new gameplay directions.

The Viva Piñata team was a model for productivity and regular output within Rare and Microsoft Studios. Though compared to the 12-person teams behind earlier Rare games, the company's Xbox 360 development teams consisted of 50 to 60 people. The Viva Piñata team included about 50 people at its zenith. Microsoft transitioned its development teams to use its XNA package to streamline and reduce duplication in engineering efforts. Microsoft pressured the Viva Piñata development team to keep the game's themes family-friendly, as the parent company planned for the game and resulting franchise to increase the market appeal of their Xbox 360. In 2006, a Microsoft Games executive called the game its most important franchise.

Viva Piñata was planned as a larger intellectual property. 4Kids Entertainment had agreed to make a Viva Piñata cartoon before the game was released, having selected the series out of several Microsoft properties offered. 4Kids also handled the series merchandising. The cartoon was tied very closely to the game, and its animations were based on the game's own 3D character models, with Rare's Gregg Mayles approving episodes for their applicability to the game during the show's development. The cartoon was also designed to give viewers tips on how to interact with the in-game piñatas. The animated series' storyline later influenced the plot of Trouble in Paradise.

Release

After the release of Viva Piñata in 2006, its development team saw it as incomplete. The developers cut partial ideas from the release to meet their deadlines. Rare's Gregg Mayles said that the game sold well and steadily on par with their expectations and Xbox executive Phil Spencer added that the game was considered a success inside the company. The team incorporated player feedback and worked towards a "more definitive version" of the original.

During the Microsoft press conference at E3 2007, a Microsoft Windows port of Viva Piñata was announced. The conversion was handled by Climax Group. The game is part of the Games for Windows programme which offers easier installation and support for Windows Vista's Games Explorer, Xbox 360 Controller for Windows, Parental Controls, and the use of Games For Windows - Live.

In December 2006, Microsoft collaborated with amusement park Six Flags Mexico to promote the Xbox 360 as well as Viva Piñata. At the time, it was the largest recorded piñata ever built.

Reception

Viva Piñata received "generally favorable" reviews, according to video game review aggregator Metacritic. Nearly a year after its release, Rare's Justin Cook said that the game had sold about 500,000 copies.

The graphics were unanimously praised by critics. Justin Calvert of GameSpot stated the attention to detail was "uniformly impressive", and asserted that the visuals were cohesive. Erik Brudvig of IGN found that the game's graphical slowdown during its frequent autosaving to be startling, although he praised the presentation overall. Andrew Taylor of the Official Xbox Magazine praised the vibrant use of colors and attention to detail. Will Tuttle of Team Xbox similarly stated the colors were "vividly vibrant" and the design aesthetics "remarkably appealing", although he also found the autosaving slowdown frustrating. Gerald Villoria of GameSpy stated the graphics were "breathtaking", and noted the color palettes of the piñatas themselves gave the appearance that they were "stripped directly from an animated show".

Critics commended various aspects of the gameplay. Calvert enjoyed the wide customization options and large number of piñata variations, stating that the gameplay itself was "silky smooth". Brudvig noted that there was a "ton to do"; he praised the encouragement of discovery and stated that it was "constantly filled with moments where you find something new to do". Tuttle commended the large number of piñatas, stating that finding managing all of the resources is "a lot of work". Villoria praised the "surprisingly deep" strategic gameplay, saying that it was one of the most "entertaining and fulfilling" experiences for the Xbox 360.

Viva Piñata was nominated for six awards by the Academy of Interactive Arts and Sciences for its 10th annual awards covering 2006. The music score by Grant Kirkhope was nominated for Original Score at the 2007 BAFTA awards. The game was nominated for the "Best Original Game" in X-Play's "Best Video Games of 2006" awards. Other accolades include a Parents' Choice Award from the Parents' Choice Foundation. and GameSpot included the title as one of their ten nominees for their "2006 Game of the Year" award, although it received only 3% of the total votes.

Legacy
A sequel, Viva Piñata: Trouble in Paradise was released in September 2008. The sequel adds more than 30 new piñata species, a "Just for Fun" sandbox mode, and new co-operative modes, as well as new desert and arctic environments. The original game and Trouble in Paradise were later re-released as part of the 2015 Xbox One compilation Rare Replay, but the server that handled their piñata sharing features had been shut down by that time. In June 2019, both games were enhanced to run at native 4K resolution on Xbox One X.

Rare made a Nintendo DS version of the game, titled Viva Piñata: Pocket Paradise, released in September 2008. Key changes include a control scheme which makes use of the stylus, as well as the presence of additional context-sensitive information on the second screen. A party game spin-off, Viva Piñata: Party Animals was released for the Xbox 360 in October 2007. Developed by Krome Studios, the game features the TV show piñata characters competing in races and various party mini-games.

References

Further reading

External links
 

2006 video games
Games for Windows certified games
Microsoft games
Rare (company) games
Social simulation video games
Video games scored by Grant Kirkhope
Video games scored by Steve Burke
Video games set on fictional islands
Virtual pet video games
Viva Piñata
Xbox 360 games
Xbox Cloud Gaming games
Xbox One X enhanced games
Xbox One games
Windows games
Video games developed in the United Kingdom